Science et pseudo-sciences is a quarterly science magazine issued in France since 1968, it is the press organ of the Association française pour l'information scientifique. It was created by the journalist Michel Rouzé.

According to the association, the magazine had 1400–1500 subscribers and a readership of 1400–2800 per issue in 2010. In 2010, the sale of the magazine delivered a revenue of €82,232 for production costs and €60,125 for postage costs.

References

External links
Science et pseudo-sciences website 

1968 establishments in France
Magazines published in France
French-language magazines
Magazines established in 1968
Paranormal magazines
Popular science magazines
Quarterly magazines published in France
Science and technology magazines
Scientific skepticism mass media